Novosilske (Romanian: Satu-Nou) is a selo in Reni Raion in the southern Ukrainian oblast of Odesa.

Villages in Izmail Raion
Reni Hromada